Bohemia competed in the Summer Olympic Games for the first time at the 1900 Summer Olympics in Paris, France as an independent team, though it was part of Austria-Hungary at the time.  7 athletes competed for Bohemia.

Medalists

Hedwiga Rosenbaumová also won a bronze medal in a mixed team with Archibald Warden of Great Britain — tennis, mixed doubles

Results by event

Athletics

Bohemia's silver medal came in the discus throw, part of the athletics program. Four Bohemian athletes competed in five athletics events.

 Track events

 Field events

Cycling

Bohemia competed in the second Olympic cycling competition.  The nation's only cyclist, František Hirsch, had little success.

Gymnastics

Bohemia competed in gymnastics, with one gymnast.  He won no medals.

Tennis

Rosenbaumová took bronze in the women's singles. Rosenbaumová also won another bronze medal in the mixed doubles with British playing partner Archibald Warden.

References

Nations at the 1900 Summer Olympics
1900
1900 in Austria-Hungary
Olympics